Rhectosemia is a genus of moths of the family Crambidae described by Julius Lederer in 1863.

Species
Rhectosemia antofagastalis Munroe, 1959
Rhectosemia argentipunctalis H. Druce, 1895
Rhectosemia braziliensis Munroe, 1959
Rhectosemia compositalis Schaus, 1912
Rhectosemia excisalis (Snellen, 1900)
Rhectosemia longistrialis Dognin, 1904
Rhectosemia multifarialis Lederer, 1863
Rhectosemia nomophiloides Munroe, 1959
Rhectosemia striata Munroe, 1959
Rhectosemia tumidicosta Hampson, 1913
Rhectosemia vausignalis Hampson, 1918
Rhectosemia viriditincta Munroe, 1959

References

Spilomelinae
Crambidae genera
Taxa named by Julius Lederer